Albert Joseph Brown  (July 8, 1861 – November 16, 1938) was a Canadian lawyer and politician.

Born in Windsor, Canada East, the son of Shepard Joseph Brown, a farmer, and Jennet Shanks, Brown was educated at St. Francis College and Morin College before receiving a Bachelor of Arts degree in 1883 and a Bachelor of Laws degree in 1886 from McGill University. He was called to the Quebec Bar in 1886 and was created a Queen's Counsel in 1899. He was a practising lawyer before being appointed to the Senate of Canada by R. B. Bennett in 1932. He sat as a Conservative until his death in 1938.

References

1861 births
1938 deaths
Canadian senators from Quebec
Conservative Party of Canada (1867–1942) senators
McGill University Faculty of Law alumni
Lawyers in Quebec
People from Windsor, Quebec
Canadian King's Counsel
Anglophone Quebec people